Bozağaç is a village in Gülnar district of  Mersin Province, Turkey. At  it is situated to the south of Gülnar. The population of Bozağaç was 147  as of 2012.

References

Villages in Gülnar District